Uki is a Belgian animated television series. The main character is a small yellow creature who invites his young viewers to discover the world with him. The show has been airing on Belgian and Finnish networks since April 2010. It was first shown on Club RTL and Ketnet.
 From September 2011 it was also aired on BBC's CBeebies channel, as part of Show Me Show Me.

Characters
Uki is the main character in the series and is a yellow creature with a long neck, wings and a single antenna on his head which can perform telekinesis. Neither male nor female (despite being referred to with masculine pronouns), Uki doesn't talk but expresses himself through sounds, laughter and smiles in the manner of a toddler.

In the course of each episode Uki experiences a new adventure with his friends Hedgehog, Rabbit, Squirrel, Tortoise, Duck, and the Flowers, under the protective eye of Sun and Cloud. Each episode describes a day in Uki's life.

Production

The production of the show is overseen by the Belgian arm of Universal Music Group.

The original designs were created by a Belgian design studio Topfloor (www.topfloor.to). For the actual production of the show Universal Music teamed up with Belgian production studio Creative Conspiracy, the company that was responsible for the 3D character animation in the 2D-animation feature The Triplets of Belleville.

Storylines and scripts were written by Belgian TV and children's authors Dirk Nielandt, Griet Vanhemel, Tom Neuttiens and Diane Redmond.

Music composed by Piet de Ridder. Audio postproduction by Temple Of Tune Belgium. Voices by Jorka Decroubele and Fredo Gevaert.

Set
Uki's world is safe and contained; it is the world of a child awakening to new experiences and sensations that will shape her development and deepen her understanding of her environment. Music is key to the show – simple, catchy melodic jingles that make the show accessible to even the youngest child.

Structure
The show has a modular structure: the carefully layered episode content provides the young viewer with a sequentially linked set of games, puzzles and activities that enhance the concept at the heart of the story.

Awards
In 2008 the show won the KidScreen Summit's Pitch it! Award.

Episodes

External links

References

2010 Belgian television series debuts
2010s animated television series
2010s Belgian television series
2010s Canadian animated television series
Belgian children's animated television series
French-language television programming in Belgium
Animated preschool education television series
2010s preschool education television series
CBeebies
Television shows about telekinesis